Rube Marquardt (March 7, 1894 – February 15, 1973) was an American football end who played one season for the Chicago Cardinals of the American Professional Football Association. He played college football at Northwestern University.

References

1894 births
1973 deaths
American football ends
Northwestern Wildcats football players
Chicago Cardinals players
Players of American football from Illinois
Sportspeople from Evanston, Illinois